Joana Raspall i Juanola (1 July 1913 – 4 December 2013) was a Spanish writer and librarian. She was born in Barcelona and died in Sant Feliu de Llobregat.

Selected works

Poetry
 Petits poemes per a nois i noies (1981)
 Ales i camins (1991)
 Llum i gira-sols (1994)
 Bon dia, poesia (1996)
 Degotall de poemes (1997)
 Com el plomissol (1998)
 Pinzellades en vers (1998)
 Versos amics (1998)
 Escaleta al vent (2002)
 Font de versos (2003)
 Serpentines de versos (2000)
 A compàs dels versos (2003)
 Concert de poesia (2004)
 Arpegis, haikús (2004)
 Instants haikus i tankes (2009)
 El jardí vivent (2010)
 El meu món de poesia (2011)
 Batecs de paraules (2013)
 46 poemes i 2 contes (2013)
 Joana de les paraules clares (2013)
 Divuit poemes de Nadal i un de Cap d'any (2013)
 Nou Poemes per a tot l'any (2013)
 A world of poetry! (Aplicació dispositius IOS  AppStore i Android a GooglePlay, versió anglesa)

Novels and short stories
 El mal vent (1994)
 Contes del si és no és (1994)
 La corona i l'àliga (1997)
 Contes increïbles (1999)
 La trampa de la urbanització K (2000)

References

External links
 
 Joana Raspall at escriptors.cat
 A blog about Joana Raspall
 Webpage devoted to Joana Raspall i Juanola at LletrA (UOC), Catalan Literature Online (Catalan)

Writers from Catalonia
Spanish centenarians
Women centenarians
Spanish librarians
Spanish women librarians
Writers from Barcelona
1913 births
2013 deaths
Lexicographers of Catalan
20th-century lexicographers
21st-century lexicographers
Women lexicographers